St Mewan is a civil parish and village in south Cornwall, England, United Kingdom.

The village is approximately one mile (1.6 km) west of St Austell. It is a small settlement, comprising the parish church, rectory, a school and nearby farms. St Mewan parish includes the villages of Sticker, Trelowth, Trewoon, and most of Polgooth. An electoral ward with the name St Mewan also exists. The population at the 2011 census was 3,402.

Parish church
The church is dedicated to Saint Mewan, a sixth-century Celtic saint who was born in Wales, visited Cornwall, and is mostly venerated in Brittany. The current building dates from the 13th century and is mentioned in a bishops' inquisition of 1294 as the 'Ecclesia de St Mewany'. It was, however, substantially rebuilt in 1854 by George Edmund Street and enlarged in 1890. The church tower is of only two stages and is built of granite blocks. Local legend suggests that the original builders were prevented from raising it higher by the devil, who threw down their stones each night.

Education
St Mewan Community Primary School was founded (as St Mewan Board School) in the nineteenth century, the main building being designed by Silvanus Trevail in 1874. The schoolmaster's house had previously been the St Mewan Inn. The school currently has around 400 pupils.

St Mewan Beacon

This natural landmark lies some distance from the village, to the north-west of Trewoon. It is a tor exposure of quartz-topaz-tourmaline rocks that has been designated a Site of Special Scientific Interest (SSSI) for its geological characteristics. St Mewan Beacon was studied by Cornish mining engineer and mineralogist Joseph Henry Collins who published an account of it in 1914.

References

External links

 Genuki page on St Mewan
 Cornwall Record Office Online Catalogue for St Mewan

Civil parishes in Cornwall
Villages in Cornwall